The National Tax Association - Tax Institute of America (NTA) is a US non-profit, non-partisan organization committed to the study and discussion of public taxation, spending, and borrowing decisions by governments around the world.  Since its founding in 1907, the NTA has remained the leading association of tax professionals and public finance scholars devoted to advancing the theory and practice of public finance. Its focus remains on education rather than political debate. The organization educates government officials, tax professionals, and the general public.

The National Tax Association was founded in Ohio in 1907 by a group of "nearly 100 lawyers, university professors, business leaders, and government administrators". The organization's initial goal was to advocate for tax reform with the goal of creating alternate taxation models which could then be adopted by municipalities. However, due to a long-term lack of consensus on how to replace the property tax, its focus moved away from tax reform in 1930. In the 2000s, the organization consists in large part of public finance economists.

References 

Taxpayer groups